is a Japanese politician of the Liberal Democratic Party, a member of the House of Representatives in the Diet (national legislature). A native of Kamiita, Tokushima and graduate of Tokyo University of Agriculture, he had served in the assembly of Tokushima Prefecture for four terms since 1981. He was elected to the House of Representatives for the first time in 1993. He also served as mayor of Kamiita, Tokushima, from 2013 to 2017.

References

External links 
 Official website in Japanese.

|-

|-

|-

1951 births
Living people
People from Tokushima Prefecture
Members of the House of Representatives (Japan)
Liberal Democratic Party (Japan) politicians
21st-century Japanese politicians